Zhu Ling is the name of the following Chinese people:

Zhu Ling (Three Kingdoms) (朱靈; died 223), general of Cao Wei during the Three Kingdoms period
Zhu Ling (economist) (朱玲; born 1951), Chinese economist
Zhu Ling (volleyball) (朱玲; born 1957), Chinese volleyball player
Zhu Ling (poisoning victim) (朱令; born 1973), victim of a thallium poisoning incident
Zhu Ling (China Daily), Editor in Chief of China Daily
 Chü Ling also known as Chü Ling Hu (sources: A Chart of the magic Art of Being Invisible, A Record of Researches into Spirits) Chinese River God

See also
Yuan Chiung-chiung (born 1950), Taiwanese writer who used the pen name Zhu Ling (朱陵)